Narcissus tazetta (paperwhite, bunch-flowered narcissus, bunch-flowered daffodil, Chinese sacred lily, cream narcissus, joss flower, polyanthus narcissus) is a perennial ornamental plant that grows from a bulb. Cultivars of N. tazetta include 'Paperwhite', 'Grand Soleil d'Or' and 'Ziva', which are popularly used for forcing indoors, as is the form of N. tazetta known as Chinese Sacred Lily.

Description 

Umbels have as many as 8 flowers, white with a yellow corona.

Taxonomy

Subspecies
Six subspecies are accepted by the World Checklist of Selected Plant Families:

 N. tazetta subsp. aureus (Jord. & Fourr.) Baker syn. N. bertolonii – south-east France, Sardinia, north-west Italy, Algeria, Morocco
 N. tazetta subsp. canariensis (Burb.) Baker – Canary Islands
 N. tazetta subsp. chinensis (M.Roem.) Masam. & Yanagih. – south-east China, Japan, South Korea
 N. tazetta subsp. corcyrensis (Herb.) Baker – Corfu (Greece)
 N. tazetta subsp. italicus (Ker Gawl.) Baker syn. N. italicus – Mediterranean from southern France to Greece
 N. tazetta subsp. tazetta – widely distributed from the western Mediterranean to Afghanistan

Ecology
Narcissus tazetta contains a fragrant compound found in only a few other plants, including roses and Acnistus arborescens, called orcinol dimethyl ether, which is almost undetectable to the human nose. Experiments with honeybees have shown they can readily detect it.

Distribution
Narcissus tazetta is a widespread species, native to the Mediterranean region from Portugal to Turkey. It is also naturalized across the Middle East, Central Asia, Iran, Afghanistan, Pakistan, India, Nepal and Bhutan, as well as the Canary Islands, China (Fujian, Zhejiang), Japan,  Australia, Korea, Norfolk Island, New Zealand, Bermuda, Mexico and the United States (Oregon, California, Texas, Alabama, Arkansas, Florida, Louisiana, Mississippi, North Carolina, South Carolina, Virginia, and West Virginia) and South America.

Uses 
Narcissus tazetta is grown commercially for its essential oil, mostly in southern France. An interspecies hybrid, with Narcissus poeticus, is also grown for its essential oil.

References

Bibliography

Books 
 translated into English as

Articles

Databases 
 The Plant List

External links 
 Narcissus tazetta in Israel, Flickr

tazetta
Garden plants
Plants described in 1753
Taxa named by Carl Linnaeus
Flora of China
Flora of Eastern Asia
Flora of Macaronesia
Flora of Central Asia
Flora of North Africa
Flora of Southeastern Europe
Flora of Southwestern Europe
Flora of Western Asia